Christopher Furness, 1st Baron Furness (23 April 1852 – 10 November 1912) was a British businessman and Liberal Party politician.

Early life
Furness was born in West Hartlepool, Durham on 23 April 1852.  He was the seventh son of John Furness of West Hartlepool, and Averill Eastor Furness (née Wilson).

Career
He started his career as a buyer in Thomas Furness and Company, wholesale provision merchants, a firm owned by his older brother Thomas, and became a partner two years later. Stock for the business had to be brought in by ship, and Christopher found that it would be cheaper to use their own vessels, rather than hire other peoples. Consequently, on his initiative, the firm bought several steam ships from local shipbuilder William Gray & Company in 1877.

In 1882, Christopher Furness and Company was formed and the business was split into two. Thomas kept the provision merchants, while Christopher took charge of the shipping fleet. After seven years as a partner in the shipbuilding firm of Edward Withy and Company, Furness merged it with his own company in 1891, to form Furness, Withy and Company, which was run by his nephew, Sir Stephen Furness, 1st Baronet after his death.  By a series of mergers, his firms become the main employers in Hartlepool, until they finally closed in the 1980s.

In 1901, he sold a ship he had ordered, the Huronian, before it sailed; it was reported missing, later lost, in early 1902 during its maiden voyage to Canada. It was deemed to have sunk with the loss of all those aboard; in 1907 a letter in a bottle sent from the ship washed up in Ireland.

Political career
Furness was also involved in politics, and was elected Member of Parliament for The Hartlepools at a by-election in 1891. He lost the seat in 1895, but was re-elected in 1900, and served until his re-election in January 1910 was declared void after an electoral petition.

He was appointed a knight bachelor in the 1895 Birthday Honours, and in 1910 he was raised to the peerage as Baron Furness, of Grantley in the West Riding of the County of Yorkshire. In 1909 he was made an Honorary Freeman of West Hartlepool.

Personal life
On 16 May 1876, Furness married Jane Annette Suggitt (1855–1930), the only daughter of Henry Suggitt of Brierton, county Durham. They had one son:

 Marmaduke Furness (1883–1940), who in 1918 was created Viscount Furness.

Christopher Furness died on 10 November 1912, aged 60. He was succeeded in the barony by his son Marmaduke.

References

External links 
 
 
 Christopher Furness, 1st Baron Furness (1852–1912), Shipowner, industrialist and politician at the National Portrait Gallery, London.

1852 births
1912 deaths
Furness, Christopher Furness, 1st Baron
Knights Bachelor
Liberal Party (UK) MPs for English constituencies
UK MPs 1886–1892
UK MPs 1892–1895
UK MPs 1900–1906
UK MPs 1906–1910
UK MPs 1910
UK MPs who were granted peerages
People from West Hartlepool
Barons created by George V